James Durkin (May 21, 1876 – March 12, 1934) was a Canadian-American actor and director of the stage and screen.

Biography
He was born in Quebec on May 21, 1876. Durkin's father was a Commissioner of Crown Lands for the province of Quebec. He was a graduate of De La Salle College in Toronto.

In 1906, he made his Broadway debut in the play Julie Bonbon. The following year, he played the male lead in the play Margaret Fleming at Chicago's New Theatre.

While working on Broadway, he met actress Maude Fealy and became her second husband on November 28, 1909. They divorced in 1917. According to the Internet Broadway Database, he acted in six Broadway productions from 1906 to 1923 and directed Chivalry (1925-1926).

After several years on the stage, Durkin moved into film. He worked for the Thanhouser Company from late spring 1913 to 1914, acting and directing his wife. When Fealy and Durkin left Thanhouser, the trade journal Variety speculated that the couple planned to start a film company of their own. In June 1915, he signed on with the Famous Players Film Company as a director. In December of the same year, Durkin left Famous-Players, signing a two-year contract with Lewis J. Selznick's Equitable Pictures.

He continued working in film into the 1930s. He had two daughters, Alice Louise (born 1921) and Margaret Jane (born 1927), with his second wife, Alice Naylor.

He died on March 12, 1934, in Los Angeles, California.

Filmography

Actor

Director

Notes

General references

References

External links

James Durkin(Kinotv)

1876 births
1934 deaths
Male actors from Quebec
Canadian male stage actors
Canadian theatre directors
Canadian male film actors
Film directors from Quebec
Canadian emigrants to the United States
20th-century Canadian male actors